Events from the year 2003 in Denmark.

Incumbents
 Monarch – Margrethe II
 Prime minister – Anders Fogh Rasmussen

Events
12 October – The second phase of the Copenhagen Metro opens, extending it to Vanløse

The arts

Architecture

Film
 23 March — This Charming Man by Martin Strange-Hansen wins an Oscar for Best Short Subject at the 75th Academy Awards.
 23 May – Christoffer Boe's film Reconstruction wins the Caméra d'Or at the 2003 Cannes Film Festival.

Literature

Music
 15 November — The first ever Junior Eurovision Song Contest was held in Copenhagen, Denmark.

Television
 24 November – DR series Nikolaj and Julie  wins the Emmy Award for Best Drama Series at the 31st International Emmy Awards.

Sports

Badminton
 28 July  3 August  Denmark wins one gold medal and two bronze medals at the 2003 IBF World Championships.

Other
 15 March — Wilson Kipketer wins silver in Menøs 800 metres at the 2003 IAAF World Indoor Championships in Birmingham, United Kingdom.
 11 April — Mikkel Kessler wins the WBC International title by defeating Craig Cummings by a knockout in the third round.
 15 June — Tom Kristensen wins the 2003 24 Hours of Le Mans as part of Team Bentley, his fifth win of the 24 Hours of Le Mans race.
 22 June — Søren Kjeldsen wins the Diageo Championship at Gleneagles.
 15 July — Jakob Piil wins the 10th stage of the 2003 Tour de France.
 4 October – Nicki Pedersen becomes Speedway World Champion by winning the 2003 Speedway Grand Prix series.
 23 November — Thomas Bjørn wins Dunlop Phoenix Tournament in Japan.

Football
 11 October — Denmark draws with Bosnia and Herzegovina in the last round of in the UEFA Euro 2004 qualifying, but still wins Group 2 and was thus ready for UEFA Euro 2004.

Births
Rasmus Højlund
29 April – Holger Rune, Tennis player

Deaths

See also
2003 in Danish television

References

 
Denmark
Years of the 21st century in Denmark
Denmark
2000s in Denmark